is a retired Japanese professional boxer who is a former WBC and lineal flyweight champion.

Early life
Kobayashi was poor at sports in his childhood. He was a slow runner, and lacked in arm strength. He began boxing at Tanabe Boxing Gym while studying design at Tokyo Designer Gakuin College after graduating from high school, and transferred to Kadoebi Houseki Boxing Gym after a year.

Professional career
Kobayashi made his professional debut with a third round knockout victory in December  1978. He won the annual Japanese boxing series, East Japan Rookie King Tournament in the flyweight division by knocking out the future Japanese featherweight champion Hiroyuki Kobayashi at the Korakuen Hall in December 1979. However, he was knocked out by Jirō Watanabe in the first round of the final match of All-Japan Rookie King Tournament at the Osaka Prefectural Gymnasium in February 1980. He then had a fifteen-fight winning streak including ten knockouts over the former world ranked boxer Facomron Vibonchai, the national champions of Thailand, Philippines, Korea and others.
 
On January 18, 1984, Kobayashi fought against Frank Cedeño for the WBC and lineal flyweight titles at the Korakuen Hall. For that fight, Isamu Mitsuhira, the former trainer of Kyokutō Boxing Club to which Yoshiaki Numata belonged, served as his special coach. Kobayashi, who appeared in the ring while listening to the music with the Walkman, knocked out Cedeño flooring him four times with his left crosses and left hook in the second round to be crowned the new champion.

In his first defense in April 1984, he was knocked out by the mandatory challenger Gabriel Bernal in the second round at the Korakuen Hall. Kobayashi moved up in weight division and was poised to be a two division champion, but lost to Kazuo Katsuma via a twelfth round stoppage in the WBC junior bantamweight title eliminator in March 1985. He retired after a two-fight losing streak.

Currently Kobayashi teaches sports as a civil servant in Katsushika.

See also
List of flyweight boxing champions
List of WBC world champions
List of The Ring world champions
List of Japanese boxing world champions
Boxing in Japan

References

Bibliography

External links

Kōji Kobayashi - CBZ Profile

|-

|-

|-

World Boxing Council champions
World flyweight boxing champions
World boxing champions
Sportspeople from Tokyo
1957 births
Living people
Japanese male boxers